This is a comparison of file hosting services which are currently active. File hosting services are a particular kind of online file storage; however, various products that are designed for online file storage may not have features or characteristics that others designed for sharing files have.

File hosting services

Former services

See also 
 Cloud storage
 Comparison of file synchronization software
 Comparison of online backup services
 Comparison of online music lockers
 List of backup software
 Remote backup service
 Shared disk access

Footnotes

References

External links 
 

Cloud storage
File hosting
File hosting for Linux
File hosting for macOS
File hosting for Windows
File hosting services
Companies' terms of service